This is a recap of the 1983 season for the Professional Bowlers Association (PBA) Tour.  It was the tour's 25th season, and consisted of 35 events. Earl Anthony registered his second career "three-peat" at the PBA National Championship, giving him six titles in this event overall. (He had also won the event three years in a row from 1973–75.) Anthony won one more title on the season and collected his sixth career PBA Player of the Year award.

Gary Dickinson won his first PBA major title (eighth overall) at the BPAA U.S. Open, while Joe Berardi was victorious at the Firestone Tournament of Champions. 

Norm Duke became the PBA Tour's youngest champion ever (18 years, 345 days) when he won the Cleveland Open on March 5. In his first-ever TV match, Duke defeated the legendary Earl Anthony, then went on to knock off three more previous Tour champions for the title.

Tournament schedule

References

External links
1983 Season Schedule

Professional Bowlers Association seasons
1983 in bowling